On August 6, 1907, Morton MacAuley, an alderman on Edmonton City Council, resigned from council.  Since his term was not due to expire until December, the city held a by-election on August 26. George Manuel defeated James D. Blayney by a count of 482 votes to 370 votes, and was elected to fulfill Macauley's term.

References
City of Edmonton: Edmonton Elections

1907-08
1907 elections in Canada
1907 in Alberta